Lissonomimus auratopilosus is a species of beetle in the family Cerambycidae. It was described by Di Iorio in 1998.

References

Trachyderini
Beetles described in 1998